Lágrimas or Lagrimas, Spanish for "tears", may refer to:

 Lágrimas, 2020 mixtape by Yung Beef
 "Lágrimas" (Dulce Maria song), 2013
 "Lágrimas" (JD Natasha song), 2004
 "Lágrimas", 1983 song by José José from Secretos
 "Lágrimas", 1995 song by Thalía from En Éxtasis
 Lagrimas Untalan (1911–1997), educator and politician, one of the first two female members of the Legislature of Guam

See also
 Lagrima, a Lebanese band
 Lágrima (Tárrega), a guitar composition